The 2002 Palestine Solidarity Tournament was the tournament held in Sanaa, Yemen from 19 to 23 May 2002 in solidarity of Palestine for under 23 national teams.

Participating teams
The Olympic teams under 23 years of age participated in this tournament ː

Final tournament

Matches

Final standing

References

External links
Palestine Solidarity Tournament (U-23) 2002 (Yemen) - rsssf.com

Arab
Arab
August 2002 sports events in Asia
September 2002 sports events in Asia